Viduthalai Virumbi  is a Member of the Parliament of India representing Tamil Nadu in the Rajya Sabha, the upper house of the Indian Parliament as a member of the Dravida Munnetra Kazhagam party.

References

External links
 "RAJYA SABHA MEMBERS BIOGRAPHICAL SKETCHES 1952 - 2003"

1939 births
Living people
Dravida Munnetra Kazhagam politicians
Rajya Sabha members from Tamil Nadu